No 2 Range Halt railway station is a former railway station, on the Longmoor Military Railway, serving No 2 range, it was sometimes known as Two Range Halt implying there were two ranges but the halt was only close to No 2 range.

The station probably opened in 1932, it is mentioned in the winter timetable as a request stop but is not mentioned in the summer 1932 timetable.

The station had no platforms or other facilities except for a block post, the Army's name for a signal box.

The station was closed along with the rest of the line on 31 October 1969.



References

Citations

Bibliography

Further reading
 

Disused railway stations in Hampshire
Former Longmoor Military Railway stations